The Broom Cupboard may refer to:

 "The Broom Cupboard", episode of The Unit (season 2)
 The Broom Cupboard, former studio presentation for the BBC Children's services.